Asambhav is an Indian Marathi language TV serial which aired on Zee Marathi. The show starred Umesh Kamat and Urmila Kanetkar in lead roles. It received various awards. 

The serial is based on the popular concept of re-incarnation in Hindu culture. The drama revolved around the cast which were presented as the rebirths of the past life and the dramatic events that occurred in their lives. The serial's screenplay / writer was Chinmay Mandlekar and was directed by Satish Rajwade. The series premiered on 12 February 2007, replacing Vadalvaat.

Plot
A young woman remembers the wrongs done to her in her past life and takes rebirth to avenge herself. As her mission unfolds, many secrets of the past are unveiled. Adinath Shastri, the second child of Madhusudan Shastri returns to India from the US for a sabbatical and plans to marry Sulekha who is his aunt's sister. They fall in love over the Internet and plan to marry as soon as he comes back and has plans to go back to the US with her. Adinath and Sulekha get engaged and plan to marry soon. However, fate takes an unexpected twist when he travels to Konkan for work and accidentally meets Shubhra after he meets with an accident. Shubhra lives with her mother and is supposed to marry Ramakant Khot. She nurses Adinath back to health and congratulates him on his engagement. Adinath is surprised as he does not remember telling Shubhra about it, to which she replies that she had a vision in which she saw him getting engaged. Adinath is taken by surprise. As a few days pass by, Shubhra and Adinath spend time together and get married without any plans. They return to the "Wada" (ancestral mansion) in Vasai (near Mumbai) on the day he was supposed to marry Sulekha, where his family members are in full swing with the marriage preparations. He introduces Shubhra as his wife to which everyone reacts atrociously. Sulekha is heartbroken and fumes at Adinath and Shubhra. Initially, the family members reject his decision but later accept Shubhra.

Adinath's grandfather- Dinanath Shastri says that Shubra has a striking resemblance to his sister-in-law  Parvati Vahini who mysteriously disappeared about six decades ago. He welcomes Shubhra and regards her as the reincarnation of Parvati. That night, an old man by the name of Sopan (who used to be the servant at the Wada 60–70 years ago and now lived in the outhouse of the Wada) mysteriously disappears and later confronts Sulekha. At first, Sulekha doesn't pay any heed to him until he addresses her as Indumati and later explains to her that she is "his Indumati" who died mysteriously when he was young. (Here it is implied that Sulekha is, in fact, a reincarnation of Indumati, the antagonist) Sopan presents her with an ugly figurine that of a woman playing tambourine (later revealed to be the Idol of Fire Force used in Black Magic) and says that the figurine will help her regain her memories of past life and give her the strength to finish the goal which she had vowed then. And returns to Wada. In the meantime, at the Shastri's, things go on in a mundane way until Shubra has visions again where she sees a black car hitting a teenage boy, although she doesn't know who the boy is. She has the visions repeatedly but Adinath doesn't take it seriously. Later Shubra has a vision of the outhouse being set on fire and warns Adinath about it. A day later the outhouse really has a fire accident and Sopan escapes and takes refuge at Sulekha's house. Everyone considers Sopan as dead. 

Adinath's nephew (Chandu's son) Prathamesh is mute but he mumbles and addresses Shubhra as Parvati even though no one tells him about her. He becomes friends with Shubra and both of them have a good understanding among themselves. Prathamesh behaves in a strange fashion and sketches all the visions Shubra has although no one tells him anything. Later on, it is revealed that Prathamesh is a re-incarnation of Goda (Indumati's younger sister), a timid but good maid who used to work at the Wada when Parvati existed. It is also revealed that Adinath is, in fact, the reincarnation of Mahadev Shastri (Parvati's husband, Dinanath's elder brother) and hence fate brought Shubhra and Adinath (past life's Parvati and Mahadev) together under mystical circumstances and got them married as strangers. Adinath's sister Priya Shastri (Sharvari Patankar) has an unexplained resent towards Sulekha from the time Adinath introduces her to his family. As the story progresses, the visions seen by Shubhra come true. The boy seen by Shubhra is, in fact, Nikhil Shastri (Sulekha's nephew and Adinath's cousin) who is hit by the black car. (Sulekha hypnotizes Nikhil and hence causes the accident) and in a similar way brings about the death of her own mother (Meena Naik), Kshipra (Sujata Joshi), BalKrishna Shastri (her brother-in-law, Nikhil's father).

Shubra and Adinath consult a neurophysiologist Dr. Samant to regain the memories of their past life while in parallel Sulekha consults a lady by the name Tanishka (Manjusha Godse-Datar) to learn the art of mind control and hypnosis more profoundly. Dr. Samant is shown to be the reincarnation of Shrirang Ranade (Mahadev's Best friend). Both Sulekha and Shubra dive into their past birth and the story unfolds that Parvati and Mahdev were once a happy couple but did not have any children and Parvati was a staunch believer of Lord Shri Krishna and plans to name her children after the names of Krishna (which unfortunately never happens). Dinanath Shstri hence fulfills her wish with his own children (Hence the names Madhusudan Shastri (Adinath's father), BalKrishna Shastri).

Meanwhile, in the village of Vasai two sisters, Goda and Indumati, arrive. Bhalchandra the brother-in-law of Mahadev has an extra marital affair with Indumati which when discovered infuriates the patriarch of the Shastri family (Mahadev's father) and he humiliates Indumati in front of the entire village by applying back color on her face and making her ride a donkey. Simultaneously, a person by the name Shrirang Ranade comes to the Wada and Mahadev takes to the misunderstanding (thanks to Bhalchandra) that there is something going on between Parvati and him (Shrirang) and banishes Parvati from the Wada. Indumati (present day's Sulekha) then vows that she would destroy the Shastri family and uses black magic and kills everyone from Shastri family except young Dinanath Shastri (who is saved at the last moment by Parvati) and in the process, she, Indumati and Goda are buried alive in a landslide in the underground passageway near the wada. Since the story of revenge remains incomplete in the past birth, Indumati, Parvati, Goda, Mahadev and other characters take rebirth and finish the incomplete vows.

Cast
 Umesh Kamat as Adinath Shastri / Mahadev Shastri: Adinath is the reincarnation of his great-uncle Mahadev.
 Manasi Salvi / Urmila Kanetkar as Shubhra Shastri / Parvati Shastri: Shubhra is Adinath's wife and is the reincarnation of Parvati, who was Mahadev's wife. Shubhra has the ability to see flashes of her previous life and helps Dinanath decode the mysteries of the disappearances of Mahadev and Parvati, and in the search of the family treasure.
 Neelam Shirke as Sulekha Raut / Indumati: Sulekha is the reincarnation of Indumati, a prostitute who was bent on destroying the Shastri family. Sulekha was Adinath's girlfriend before he suddenly married Shubhra. Sulekha later gains the ability to see flashes of her past life, as well as supernatural psychic powers, which she uses to try and destroy the Shastri family.
 Anand Abhyankar as Dinanath Shastri: He is the patriarch of the Shastri family, the grandfather of Adinath, and younger brother of Mahadev. He lives in the ancestral family home in Vasai, and has been trying for years to uncover the mystery of the disappearances of Mahadev and Parvati, and Mahadev's madness in his final years. He is also trying to locate the family treasure hidden by Mahadev, and takes Shubhra's help in solving the many clues left by Mahadev leading towards it.

References

External links
 
 

Marathi-language television shows
2007 Indian television series debuts
2009 Indian television series endings
Zee Marathi original programming